Aphelandra anderssonii is a species of plant in the family Acanthaceae. It is endemic to Ecuador.  Its natural habitat is subtropical or tropical moist montane forests. It is threatened by habitat loss.

References

Flora of Ecuador
anderssonii
Vulnerable plants
Taxonomy articles created by Polbot
Plants described in 1996